Tadeusz Stanisław Wrona (born 26 March 1951 in Szczecin) is a Polish politician, local official, President of Częstochowa (1990-1995 and 2002-2009), Member of the Polish Parliament (1997-2001). In 2010 counselor of Lech Kaczyński.

Biography 
Wrona graduated from Henryk Sienkiewicz High School in Częstochowa and in 1974 from the Częstochowa Polytechnic. In 1982 he earned a doctorate in engineering, then worked in the Polytechnic until 1990 and again from 1996 to 1997.

In 1980 he was co-founder of the Solidarity movement at the Polytechnic. From 18 June 1990 to 3 November 1995 he was mayor of Częstochowa<ref name="kalend">[http://www.czestochowa.um.gov.pl/miasto/wspolnota/kalendarium.html Kalendarium ważniejszych działań samorządu miasta Częstochowy w latach 1990–2002]</ref> and member of City Council (1990–1998). From 1997 to 2001 he was a member of the national Sejm.

In 2002 he again became mayor of Częstochowa and was re-elected in 2006. In 2009 a group of citizens tried to change the mayor by petition, and as a result of a referendum, he was dismissed.

In 2010 he was again a candidate in local elections but didn't become mayor; he did become a member of City Council. In 2011 he started work with the Supreme Audit Office (Najwyższa Izba Kontroli'') and resigned his seat on City Council.

Political views 

He is strongly associated with right-wing parties such as AWS or PiS. He created in Częstochowa his local social initiative - the Local Government Community, referred to as the center-right organization, from which he left in 2011.

He was repeatedly criticized for his attachment to Jasna Góra and the Catholic Church - inhabitants accused him of taking more care of the interests of the church than the residents. This was the main argument of his opponents during the referendum on his dismiss.

References

External links 
 
 Biography on Sejm's sites

1951 births
Solidarity Electoral Action politicians
Members of the Polish Sejm 1997–2001
People from Częstochowa
Politicians from Szczecin
Mayors of places in Poland
Living people